The following lists events that happened during 2008 in Laos.

Incumbents
President: Choummaly Sayasone
Vice President:  Bounnhang Vorachith
Prime Minister: Bouasone Bouphavanh

Events
date unknown - 2008 Lao League

Deaths
September 9 – Nouhak Phoumsavanh, President of Laos (b. 1910)

References

 
Years of the 21st century in Laos
Laos
2000s in Laos
Laos